The Twelve Apostles is a large stone circle located between the villages of Holywood and Newbridge, near Dumfries, Scotland. It is the seventh largest stone circle in Britain and the largest on the mainland of Scotland. It is similar in design to the stone circles of Cumbria, and is considered to be an outlier of this group. Its south-westerly arrangement aligns it with the midwinder sunset.

It is a scheduled ancient monument.

Description

The circle is composed of eleven stones, of which five are earthfast; however, there were originally twelve. A plan taken by Francis Grose in 1789 shows twelve stones and the First Statistical Account, published two years later, records the same number. One of the stones was removed before 1837, when the New Statistical Account entry for Holywood was compiled. The 25 inch Ordnance Survey map of 1850 shows twelve stones in the circle, but this is due to an accidental spot of blue ink on the original plan which was carried on to published work.

Local traditions recorded in the nineteenth century associate the stones with the twelve apostles of Jesus Christ, and link the removed twelfth stone with Judas Iscariot. W. C. Lukis notes that in one tradition the stones were said to be set up by the apostles.

The circle measures  at its maximum diameter. It is not a true circle in formation; rather, it is an example of Alexander Thom's Type B 'flattened circle'.

All but one of the stones are Silurian rock; the other being Porphyry. Four, including the Porphyry rock, are natural boulders; the rest have been quarried. The nearest occurrence of Silurian rock is two miles away, near Irongray Church.

The Easthill stone circle is 3¾ miles SSW west of the Twelve Apostles. There was another stone circle a mile east near the River Nith but this was destroyed and used for building material before the New Statistical Account was compiled. Nearby are two cursuses, one of which, if extended, would run towards the circle.

In 1882 it was reported that a four inch bronze figure was uncovered at the circle some years before. This has since been identified as Saint Norbert, founder of the Premonstratensian order and dated to the twelfth century. It is now housed in the Dumfries Museum.

See also 
Stone circles in the British Isles and Brittany
List of stone circles

References

External links
Video and commentary on the Twelve Apostles Stone Circle

1789 archaeological discoveries
Stone circles in Dumfries and Galloway
Scheduled Ancient Monuments in Dumfries and Galloway
Twelve Apostles
Silurian Scotland